Football clubs in the Myanmar National League compete in the AFC Champions League annually.This details the participation and performances in the competition since its based at 2002 as a result of the merger between the Asian Club Championship, the Asian Cup Winners' Cup and the Asian Super Cup.

Participations

QS : Qualifying Stage, G : Group Round, R16 : Round of 16, Q : Quarterfinals, S : Semifinal, R : Runner-up, W : Winner

Statistics by club

Shan United

Results

Yadanarbon

Results

Yangon United

Results

Overall statistics

By clubs

See also 
 Australian soccer clubs in the AFC Champions League
 Chinese football clubs in the AFC Champions League
 Indian football clubs in Asian competitions
 Indonesian football clubs in Asian competitions
 Iranian football clubs in the AFC Champions League
 Iraqi football clubs in the AFC Champions League
 Japanese football clubs in the AFC Champions League
 Qatari football clubs in the AFC Champions League
 Saudi Arabian football clubs in the AFC Champions League
 South Korean football clubs in the AFC Champions League
 Thai football clubs in the AFC Champions League
 Vietnamese football clubs in the AFC Champions League

References

 Champions League
Football clubs in the AFC Champions League